The 1924 Tempe Normal Owls football team was an American football team that represented Tempe Normal School (later renamed Arizona State University) as an independent during the 1924 college football season. In their second season under head coach Aaron McCreary, the Owls compiled a 6–1–1 record and outscored their opponents by a combined total of 160 to 85. Delbert Goddard was the team captain.

Schedule

References

Tempe Normal
Arizona State Sun Devils football seasons
Tempe Normal Owls football